The Grammy Award for Best Soul Gospel Performance, Male was awarded from 1984 to 1989.  In 1990 this award was combined with the award for Best Soul Gospel Performance, Female as the Grammy Award for Best Soul Gospel Performance, Male or Female.

Years reflect the year in which the Grammy Awards were presented, for works released in the previous year.

Recipients

References

External links
 19th Annual Awards Winners & Nominees

Grammy Awards for gospel music